The  is a limited express train service between  and  in Hokkaido, which is operated by Hokkaido Railway Company (JR Hokkaido). It was named  between 2000 and 2017.

Service pattern
There is only one single daily return working per direction, with an average journey time between Sapporo and Wakkanai lasting approximately 5 hours 10 minutes.

The train operates over the same route as the Sarobetsu, which operates between Asahikawa and Wakkanai.

Station stops
The service calls at the following stations:

 –  – – –  –  –  –  –  –  –  –  –  –  –  –  – 

Rolling stock
Services are normally formed of 4-car KiHa 261 series DMUs, which were introduced from the start of services on 11 March 2000, with car 1 at the Wakkanai end. Car 1 consists of both ordinary-class seats and the Green Car, while the other cars are ordinary-class cars. All cars are no-smoking. These are lengthened to 6 cars during busy seasons.

References

External links

 Super Sōya information on JR Hokkaido official website 

Hokkaido Railway Company
Named passenger trains of Japan
Railway services introduced in 2000
2000 establishments in Japan